WSJF may refer to:

 
 WSJF-LP, a low-power radio station (92.7 FM) licensed to serve Eldersburg, Maryland, United States
 a former call sign of the radio station WBHU